An autothrottle (automatic throttle, also known as autothrust, A/T) is a system that allows a pilot to control the power setting of an aircraft's engines by specifying a desired flight characteristic, rather than manually controlling the fuel flow. The autothrottle can greatly reduce the pilots' work load and help conserve fuel and extend engine life by metering the precise amount of fuel required to attain a specific target indicated air speed, or the assigned power for different phases of flight. A/T and AFDS (Auto Flight Director Systems) can work together to fulfill the whole flight plan.

Working modes

There are two parameters that an A/T can maintain, or try to attain: speed and thrust.

In speed mode the throttle is positioned to attain a set target speed.  This mode controls aircraft speed within safe operating margins. For example, if the pilot selects a target speed which is slower than stall speed, or a speed faster than maximum speed, the autothrottle system will maintain a speed closest to the target speed that is within the range of safe speeds.

In the thrust mode the engine is maintained at a fixed power setting according to the different flight phases. For example, during takeoff, the A/T maintains constant takeoff power until takeoff mode is finished. During climb, the A/T maintains constant climb power; in descent, the A/T reduces the setting to the idle position, and so on. When the A/T is working in thrust mode, speed is controlled by pitch (or the control column), and not by the A/T. A radar altimeter feeds data to the autothrottle mostly in this mode. (In Boeing aircraft it feeds data to the autothrottle every time. See below.)

Usage 

On Boeing-type aircraft, A/T can be used in all flight phases from takeoff, climb, cruise, descent, approach, all the way to land or go-around, barring malfunction. Taxi is not considered a part of flight, and A/T does not work for taxiing. In most cases, A/T mode selection is automatic without the need of any manual selection unless interrupted by pilots.

According to Boeing-published flight procedures, A/T is engaged BEFORE the takeoff procedure and is automatically disconnected two seconds after landing. During flight, manual override of A/T is always available. A release of manual override allows A/T to regain control, and the throttle will go back to the A/T commanded position except for two modes (Boeing type aircraft): IDLE and THR HLD. In these two modes, the throttle will remain at the manual commanded position.

History 
A primitive autothrottle was first fitted to later versions of the Messerschmitt Me 262 jet fighter late in World War II. However, the first commercial airplane with this system, which was named AutoPower, was DC-3 (since 1956). The first version was able to keep constant angle of attack but speed only during approach. When the possibility of maintaining of speed during entire flight was introduced, the modern autothrottle was created.

Shortly after AutoPower's success companies Sperry (now part of Honeywell) and Collins have started competing in autothrottle's development, equipping with it more and more liners and business jets.

Today it is often linked to a Flight Management System, and FADEC is an extension of the concept to control many other parameters besides fuel flow.

See also
Thrust lever
Asiana Airlines Flight 214 - crashed when the pilot changed the auto pilot setting that disengaged the auto-throttle 
Atlas Air Flight 3591 – 2019 crash of a Boeing 767 freighter in which the pilot unknowingly switched the A/T to go-around mode in instrument meteorological conditions and suffered a head-up somatogravic illusion
TAROM Flight 371 - crashed after an auto-throttle failure and incapacitation of the captain
Sriwijaya Air Flight 182 - crashed after an auto-throttle failure

References

External links
 

Aircraft controls
Aircraft propulsion components